Opisthorchiidae is a family of digenean trematodes. Opisthorchiidae have cosmopolitan distribution.

The most medically important species in the family Opisthorchiidae are Clonorchis sinensis, Opisthorchis viverrini, and Opisthorchis felineus, that are causes of the disease clonorchiasis.

Some species are parasites of economically important fish, e.g. Clarias gariepinus.

Subfamilies 
Thirteen subfamilies are in the family Opisthorchiidae: but their number is inconsistent:
 Allogomtiotrematinae - Gupta, 1955; Yamaguti, 1958 - two genera
 Aphallinae - Yamaguti, 1958 - one genus
 Delphinicolinae - Yamaguti, 1933 - one genus
 Diasiellinae - Yamaguti, 1958 - one genus
 Metorchiinae - Luhe, 1909 - four genera
 Oesophagicolinae - Yamaguti, 1933 - one genus
 Opisthorchiinae - Yamaguti, 1899 - 14 genera
 Pachytrematinae - Railliet, 1919; Ejsmont, 1931 - one genus
 Plotnikoviinae - Skrjabin, 1945; Skrjabin et Petrov, 1950 - one genus
 Pseudamphimerinae - Skrjabin et Petrov, 1950 - three genera
 Pseudamphistominae - Yamaguti, 1958 - two genera
 Ratziinae - Dollfus, 1929; Price, 1940 - one genus
 Tubangorchiinae - Yamaguti, 1958 - one genus

Genera 
The family Opisthorchiidae consists of 33 valid genera:
 Agrawalotrema  Sahay & Sahay, 1988
 Allogomtiotrema Yamaguti, 1958
 Amphimerus Barker, 1911
 Cladocystis Poche, 1926
 Clonorchis Looss, 1907
 Cyclorchis Luhe, 1908
 Delphinicola Yamaguti, 1933
 Diasiella Travassos, 1949
 Erschoviorchis Skrjabin, 1945
 Euamphimerus Yamaguti, 1941
 Evranorchis Skrjabin, 1944
 Gomtia Thapar, 1930
 Hepatiarius Fedzullaev, 1961
 Holometra Looss, 1899
 Metametorchis Morozov, 1939
 Metorchis Looss, 1899
 Microtrema Kobayashi, 1915
 Nigerina Baugh, 1958
 Oesophagicola Yamaguti, 1933
 Opisthorchis Blanchard, 1895
 Pachytrema Looss, 1907
 Parametorchis Skrjabin, 1913
 Paropisthorchis Stephens, 1912
 Plotnikovia Skrjabin, 1945
 Pseudamphimerus Gower, 1940
 Pseudamphistomum Luhe, 1908
 Pseudogomtiotrema Gupta & Jain, 1991
 Ratzia Poche, 1926
 Satyapalia Lakshminarayana & Hafeezullah, 1974
 Thaparotrema Gupta, 1955
 Trionychotrema Chin & Zhang, 1981
 Tubangorchis Skrjabin, 1944
 Witenbergia Vaz, 1932

References 

Trematode families
Plagiorchiida